Rajashree Warrier is a Bharata Natyam dancer. She is also a writer in Malayalam and a vocalist.

Early life and education
Rajasree Warrier was born and brought up in Thiruvananthapuram, Kerala, India. She learned Bharathanatyam under the tutelage of V Mythili and Jayanthi Subramaiam. She got trained in carnatic music under Mullamudu Harihara Iyer, Perumbavoor G. Raveendranath, Parassala Ponnammal and B. Sasikumar. Warrier also holds a post graduate diploma in journalism.

Career

Media
Warrier anchored the breakfast show Suprabhatham on Asianet for four years. She has also anchored, scripted and produced several programmes on DD Kerala, Amrita TV and Asianet.

Publications
Warrier has written two books, Narthaki published by DC Books in 2013 and Nruthakala published by Chintha Publications in 2011.

Awards and honours

 Dev dasi National Award for Bharatanatyam 2014 for outstanding creative contributions. Presented by Dev Dasi Nruthya Mandira, Bhuvaneswar.
 Kalasree Title and Kerala Sangeetha Nataka Akademi Award 2013 for Bharatanatyam.
 VS Sharma Endowment Award from Kerala Kalamandalam for the contributions in the field of Bharatanatyam, 2013.
 Invited as Jury of 'Books and Articles' in Kerala State Film Award 2014.
 Kalaratna Puraskar given by Vayalar Samskaarika Samithi 
 Mahila Tilak Title and Award for the contributions in Indian Classical Dance conferred by Social welfare department, Government of Kerala,2012.
 Indian Council for Cultural Relations – Empanelled Bharatanatyam Artist.
 Sai Natya Ratna conferred by Satya Sai Seva Organisation, 2010.
 ‘Natana Shiromani’ Award conferred by Chilanka Dance Academy, 2009.
 Recipient of Navarasam Sangeeta Sabha Award for Bharatanatyam, 2007.

Sources

Rajashreewarrier.com

Narthaki.com
Deccanherald.com
Archives.deccanchronicle.com
Deccanchronicle.com
Thehindu.com
Newindianexpress.com
Timesofindia.indiatimes.com

References

1974 births
Living people
Performers of Indian classical dance
Performing arts in India
Indian dance teachers
Indian classical choreographers
Bharatanatyam exponents
Artists from Thiruvananthapuram
Dancers from Kerala
Indian female classical dancers
Mohiniyattam exponents
Women writers from Kerala
Malayalam-language writers
Writers from Thiruvananthapuram
Indian art writers
Indian women choreographers
Indian choreographers
Women educators from Kerala
Educators from Kerala
20th-century Indian dancers
21st-century Indian dancers
Women artists from Kerala
20th-century Indian women artists
21st-century Indian women artists
Recipients of the Kerala Sangeetha Nataka Akademi Award